= Miss Principessa d'Europa =

Beauty contest

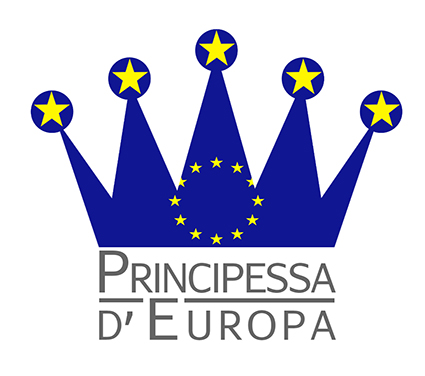
- Formation: 2010
- Type: Beauty Pageant
- Headquarters: Rome
- Location: Italy
- Members: Miss International
- Official language: Italian
- President: Devis Paganelli
- Website: Concorso di Bellezza

Miss Principessa d'Europa is an international pageant that currently selects the Italian representative for the Miss Europe World pageant. The pageant was first organized in 1999.

== History ==
Until 2014 when the competition was renamed Miss Principessa d'Europa, was called "Miss Reginetta d'Italia", the pageant was called "Miss Slide" as it was associated with the Italian magazine "Slide" which set up the competition. The Organiser and current patron of Miss Principessa d'Europa from 2010 is Devis Paganelli.

Since 2010, the contest has been one of four Italian beauty contests accredited by the Italian Fashion and Entertainment Professionals (Coordinamento Italiano Professionisti della Moda dello Spettacolo).

=== Miss Principessa d'Europa ===
Edition	Year	Winner	Region
1st	2008	Stephanie Santoromito	Lazio
2nd	2009	Missy Montes	Emilia Romagna
3rd	2010	Alina Drozdovsvhi	Veneto
4th	2011	Erika del Pizzo	Campania
5th	2012	Nataliya Mykhalchenko	Campania
6th	2013	Eleonora Mazza	Emilia Romagna
7th	2014	Giorgia Ariu	Sardegna
8th	2015	Veronica Avanzolini	Emilia Romagna
9th	2016	Rebecca Givone	Piemonte
10th	2017	Virginia Spimi	Emilia Romagna
11th	2018	Rosa Sorrentino	Campania
12th	2019	Mariana Onufriichuk	Veneto
13th	2020	Karmen Fekete	Lazio
14th	2021	Gaia Grimoldi	Lombardia
15th	2022	Daphne Lecca	Lazio
16th	2023	Haymara Gavillucci	Lazio

== Presenters ==
- Gianluca Nasi - 1999
- Gianluca Nasi - 2009-2010-2011
- Nadia Bengala - 2011
- Gianluca Nasi - 2012-2013
- Nadia Bengala - 2014
- Gianluca Nasi- from 2015 to 2023

== Official website ==
- Concorso di Bellezza
