= Miss Reginetta d'Italia =

Italian beauty pageant

Miss Reginetta d'Italia è un concorso di moda nazionale.

== History ==
Since 2012 from Devis Paganelli, the contest has been one of four Italian beauty contests accredited by the Italian Fashion and Entertainment Professionals (Coordinamento Italiano Professionisti della Moda dello Spettacolo).

=== Reginetta d'Italia ===
Edition	Year	Winner	Region
1st	2012	Nataliya Mykhalchenko	Campania
2nd	2013	Eleonora Mazza	Emilia Romagna
3rd	2014	Giorgia Ariu	Sardegna
4th	2015	Maria Malandrucco	Lazio
